Small Town Pistols is the debut studio album by Canadian country music group Small Town Pistols. It was released on February 19, 2013 by 604 Records. Its second single, "Living on the Outside," debuted on the Canadian Hot 100 in January 2013.

Small Town Pistols was nominated for Country Album of the Year at the 2014 Juno Awards.

Critical reception
Henry Lees of Top Country gave the album four and a half stars out of five, writing that it is "polished, intriguingly diverse and confident even in its introspective moments" and "showcases two young artists who have developed into top calibre musicians and songwriters."

Track listing

Chart performance

Singles

References

2013 debut albums
Small Town Pistols albums
604 Records albums